Heardred was a medieval Bishop of Hexham.

Heardred was consecrated on 30 October 797. He died in 800.

Citations

References

External links
 

Bishops of Hexham
8th-century births
800 deaths

Year of birth unknown
8th-century English bishops